Madho Singh I (December 1728 – March 5, 1768) was ruler of the state of Jaipur in the present-day Indian state of Rajasthan. He was the younger son of Jai Singh II and became ruler of Jaipur after his brother Ishwari Singh's death.

Biography

Madho Singh I was at Udaipur when his half brother Ishwari Singh committed suicide. Following this Madho Singh was crowned as the king of Jaipur state.

Madho Singh invited Jayappa Scindia who arrived in due time along with Malharrao Holkar to dinner where the Maratha sardars were served poisoned food which they detected and evaded in time. Next day on 10 January 1751, about 5000 Marathas marched through Jaipur and started exploring the city's temples and monuments. Marathas seemed to have behaved towards Jaipur like city taken by storms. Suddenly the pent-up hatred of the Rajputs burst forth and a riot broke out at noon and citizens attacked unsuspected Marathas. Madho Singh I posted assassins along the escape routes to kill off the Maratha envoys calling for aid. 

He won several important battles against other kings. He later reconciled with the Marathas after rewarding Holkar for his help in gaining the Jaipur throne by giving him the parganas of Rampura and Bhanpura in 1753. According to Vir Vinod which is 19th-century creation, Madho Singh gave poison to Raja Bakht Singh of Marwar but according to contemporary Persian sources Bakht Singh died due to cholera.

Death
He died in 1768 after a rule of 17 years after contracting dysentery after a battle with Jawahar Singh. Madho Singh's wife, the Maharani Chundawat who belonged to the Chundawat clan, was the daughter of Rawat Jaswant Singh of Deogarh, and ruled Jaipur following his death as his heir, Prithvi Singh II was only five years old at the time. Following Prithvi Singh's death, her son Pratap Singh succeeded to the throne.

Cultural Contributions

His contribution to the field of art, architecture, town-planning, literature and religion was remarkable. He founded the well planned city of Sawai Madhopur and the well planned town of Sri Madhopur, built several palaces including Madho Niwas in the Chandra Mahal complex of the City Palace, Madho Vilas the leisure palace in the centre of Jai Mahal, the Sisodia Rani ka Bagah (Queens gardens) as well as several beautiful temples. The painting atelier (surathkhana) was rejuvenated and a variety of court scenes and several portraits were painted there. He patronized Sportsmen of his State and even sent them to other places within the country to take part in competitions. Likewise, he sent artists from his State to other places to exhibit their skills and produce. He was fond of watching elephant fights, bullfights and other similar sports. He had Shaikh Sadi's Gulistan translated into Sanskrit. A few Sanskrit works were also attributed to him. Many dramas and poetic works were written under his patronage such as Veli Rukmani, Madhav Natakam, Madahava Vijaikavyama, Rajaritinirupana, Sataka, etc. Greatest contribution, at the end of his reign was political stability in the state of Jaipur.

See also
Kachwaha

References

Maharajas of Jaipur
18th-century Indian monarchs
1728 births
1768 deaths